Geum × catlingii, or Catling's avens, is a plant in the rose family, Rosaceae. It is known from eastern Canada, where it arises from natural hybridization between the native G. canadense Jacq. and the introduced G. urbanum L. It is named after Paul M. Catling, the botanist who first observed the hybrid.

Description
Geum ×catlingii is a hybrid taxon, and as such exhibits variable morphology. However, several characters in combination help distinguish it from other Geum species:

Hybrid vigor - hybrids tend to be larger than parents
Petals are creamy-yellow - intermediate between dark yellow (G. urbanum) and white (G. canadense).
Intermediate stem bract size
Highly sterile ovaries

It has been noted to bloom throughout the summer, after other species have shed their petals.

References

catlingii
Hybrid plants
Flora of North America
Plants described in 1986